Cumianus ( 641 –  736) was an Irish monk who became abbot of San Colombano di Bobbio around 715. He left Ireland as an old man. The intricately carved lid of his sarcophagus, containing a lengthy epitaph, was made by one Master John and commissioned by King Liutprand, King of the Lombards.

The inscription on the tomb reads as follows; it is written in rhythmic hexameters, a kind of hexameter in which word accent is taken into account rather than syllable length:

"Here lie the sacred limbs of Cumian;
whose soul, entering heaven, rejoices with the angels.
He was great in dignity, nobility, and beauty.
Ireland sent him as an old man to the lands of Italy:
located in Bobbio, constrained by love of the Lord,
where, by preserving the teaching of the venerable Columban,
keeping watch, fasting, tireless, constantly praying,
for four olympiads and the course of one year
he lived so felicitously that he is believed to be only fortunate,
gentle, wise, pious, peaceful to all brothers.
He lived for 90 years
and one period of five years and four months altogether.
But, most excellent Father, be a powerful intercessor
for the most glorious King Liutprand, who
has devotedly decorated your tomb with precious stone,
so that it may be manifest where your kindly body is buried."

Notes

640s births
730s deaths
8th-century Irish abbots